Jeanne Marie-Laurent (1 September 1877 – 7 April 1964) was a French film actress. She appeared in more than ninety films during her career, including the 1932 thriller Narcotics.

Selected filmography
 Les Vampires (1916)
 Faces of Children (1925)
 Thérèse Raquin (1928)
 Verdun: Visions of History (1928)
 Narcotics (1932)
 The Crisis is Over (1934)
 The Bread Peddler (1934)
 The Call of Silence (1936)
 The Red Dancer (1937)

References

Bibliography
 Youngkin, Stephen. The Lost One: A Life of Peter Lorre. University Press of Kentucky, 2005.

External links

1877 births
1964 deaths
French film actresses
French stage actresses
French silent film actresses
Actresses from Paris
20th-century French actresses